Sola is the capital village of Torba Province in Vanuatu. It is on the island of Vanua Lava.

Near the village of Sola is the volcano Mount Suretamate (also called Sürétimiat or Sere'ama). The Selva and Alket rivers pass north of the village. Fauna include saltwater crocodiles introduced by Steve Irwin, and an invasive species, fire ant.

Transportation
The village is served by Vanua Lava Airport.

Name
The name Sola comes from the Mota language, which was used as the primary language of the Melanesian Mission. Locally, the island is called Sol in Vurës, and Asol (with locative prefix a-) in the immigrant Mwotlap language. All of these terms come from a Proto-Torres-Banks form *Sola.

External links

Populated places in Vanuatu
Torba Province